Monstercat Uncaged Vol. 1 is the thirty-first compilation album by the independent record label Monstercat and was released on 12 May 2017. Uncaged Vol. 1 contains thirty-one songs from various artists as well as an album mix.

Background
Monstercat Uncaged Vol. 1 is the first of the Uncaged Monstercat compilation series, replacing the previous compilation series which was first introduced with 001 - Launch Week, released on 7 July 2011. The compilation series ended with 030 - Finale which released on 22 February 2017. Unity, a song by Rogue, Stonebank and Slips & Slurs was released as an album-exclusive to Uncaged, Vol. 1 a few days prior to the album being released.

Monstercat Uncaged Vol. 1 features 31 songs from various artists including Watch Out by Dirtyphonics & Bassnectar (featuring vocals by Ragga Twins), Borneo by Aero Chord & Wolfgang Gartner, Move That Body by Pegboard Nerds & Quiet Disorder and This Time by Kayzo. Uncaged Vol. 1 features several recurring artists from previous Monstercat compilation albums such as Mr FijiWiji, Pegboard Nerds, Darren Styles and Aero Chord as well as several newcomer artists such as Kayzo, Dirtyphonics, Bassnectar and Wolfgang Gartner.

Track listing
Monstercat Uncaged Vol. 1

Album mix

Charts

References

2017 albums
Hardcore (electronic dance music genre) albums
Future bass albums
House music albums
Electro house albums
Trap music (EDM) albums
Monstercat compilation albums